Guillermina Naya (born 27 September 1996) is an Argentine tennis player.

Naya has a career-high WTA singles ranking of 533, achieved on 10 August 2020. She also has a career-high doubles ranking of 646, achieved on 21 May 2018. She has won two singles and three doubles titles on tournaments of the ITF Circuit.

Naya also represents Argentina in Fed Cup.

She is openly lesbian and is engaged to tennis player Nadia Podoroska.

ITF Circuit finals

Singles: 3 (2 titles, 1 runner–up)

Doubles: 6 (3 titles, 3 runner–ups)

References

External links
 
 
 

1996 births
Living people
Argentine female tennis players
Tennis players from Buenos Aires
Argentine LGBT sportspeople
LGBT tennis players
Argentine lesbians
21st-century Argentine LGBT people
Lesbian sportswomen
21st-century Argentine women